Dutch New Zealanders are New Zealanders of Dutch ancestry. Dutch migration to New Zealand dates back to the earliest period of European colonisation. The 2013 census recorded 19,815 people born in the Netherlands and 28,503 people claiming Dutch ethnicity.

The Netherlands' embassy in Wellington estimated there were approximately 45,000 Dutch citizens residing in New Zealand. This number includes persons with dual New Zealand and Dutch nationality. As many as 100,000 New Zealanders are estimated to be of Dutch descent.

History

Large-scale immigration to New Zealand began post-World War II. By 1968, 28,366 Dutch immigrants had settled in New Zealand, making them the largest immigrant group after English New Zealanders. Dutch clubs were formed in areas with high numbers of Dutch immigrants to foster language skills, however a large proportion of Dutch New Zealanders lost the ability to speak Dutch.

In the 1950s, Dutch immigrants Rolf Feijen and Hans Romaine formed the Restaurant Association of New Zealand. Due to lobbying by the association, restaurants such as Otto Groen's Otto Groen and the Dutch Kiwi, a restaurant located in Waiatarua in the Waitākere Ranges of Auckland, became the first in New Zealand that was allowed to serve wine with meals.

Demographics 
There were 29,820 people identifying as being part of the Dutch ethnic group at the 2018 New Zealand census, making up 0.6% of New Zealand's population. This is an increase of 1,317 people (4.6%) since the 2013 census, and an increase of 1,179 people (4.1%) since the 2006 census. Some of the increase between the 2013 and 2018 census was due to Statistics New Zealand adding ethnicity data from other sources (previous censuses, administrative data, and imputation) to the 2018 census data to reduce the number of non-responses.

There were 14,502 males and 15,315 females, giving a sex ratio of 0.947 males per female. Of the population, 5,580 people (18.7%) were aged under 15 years, 5,598 (18.8%) were 15 to 29, 12,138 (40.7%) were 30 to 64, and 6,501 (21.8%) were 65 or older.

In terms of population distribution, 75.6% lived in the North Island and 24.5% lived in the South Island. Great Barrier Island had the highest concentration of Dutch people at 1.3%, followed by the Carterton District and the South Waikato District (both 1.2%). The Chatham Islands had the lowest concentration, recording no Dutch people.

National Museum 

The Oranjehof museum, in Foxton, tells the story of the Dutch immigrants in New Zealand. It also plays a national role in connecting the Dutch community, which is spread all through New Zealand. The Oranjehof Dutch Connection Centre is part of the Te Awahou Riverside Cultural Park, which also includes the flour-grinding windmill De Molen - a Stellingmolen, built to a 17th century design.

Notable people 

 Harry Duynhoven, former Labour MP and mayor of New Plymouth
 Elizabeth Geertruida Agatha Dyson-Weersma, journalist
 Johannes La Grouw, architect and engineer
 Henry Keesing, community leader
 Adrian Langerwerf, Catholic missionary and writer
 Marja Lubeck, Member of Parliament (Labour list MP)
 Herman van Staveren, rabbi and philanthropist
 Maarten Wevers, diplomat

Artists 

 Frank Carpay, designer
 The de Jong brothers of rock band Alien Weaponry
 Riemke Ensing, poet
 Kees Hos, artist and co-founder New Vision Gallery
 Vicky Rodewyk, model and dancer
 Theodorus Johannes Schoon, artist
 Bernardina Adriana Schramm, pianist
 Petrus Van der Velden, artist
 Hayley Westenra, classical artist
 Ans Westra, photographer
 Lydia Wevers, literary critic

Sportspeople 

 Arthur Borren, field hockey player
 Jan Borren, field hockey player
 Marie-Jose Cooper, association football player
 Andrew de Boorder, cricketer
 Derek de Boorder, cricketer
 Michelle de Bruyn, association football player
 Chris van der Drift, racecar driver
 Clarissa Eshuis, field hockey player
 Paul Gerritsen, rower
 Shane van Gisbergen, racing driver
 Willem de Graaf, association football player
 Frank van Hattum, association football player
 Carl Hoeft, rugby union footballer
 Fred de Jong, association football player
 Reuben de Jong, kickboxer and wrestler
 Chris Kuggeleijn, cricketer
 Grazia MacIntosh, association football player
 Kees Meeuws, rugby player
 Marlies Oostdam, association football player
 Simon Poelman, decathlete
 Anita Punt, field hockey player
 Dick Quax, athlete, and later a city councillor
 Riki van Steeden, association football player
 Tino Tabak, cyclist
 Wybo Veldman, rower
 Simon van Velthooven, cyclist
 Eric Verdonk, rower
 Johan Verweij, association football player
 Peter Visser, cricketer
 Elizabeth Van Welie, swimmer
 Natalie Wiegersma, swimmer

See also 
 Demographics of New Zealand
 European New Zealanders
 Europeans in Oceania
 Netherlands–New Zealand relations

References

Further reading 

 
 
 

New Zealand
 
European New Zealander